WJSN, also known as Cosmic Girls, is a South Korean girl group formed by Starship Entertainment and Yuehua Entertainment. The group debuted on February 25, 2016, with the extended play Would You Like?. The group's current lineup is composed of ten members: Seola, Bona, Exy, Soobin, Luda, Dawon, Eunseo, Yeoreum, Dayoung and Yeonjung. Originally a thirteen-piece ensemble since July 2016, Yuehua's Xuanyi, Cheng Xiao and Meiqi departed from the group on March 3, 2023, after being on hiatus since 2018.

History

2015–2016: Formation and debut

On December 4, 2015, Starship Entertainment and Yuehua Entertainment launched a 12-member girl group called WJSN, where the Korean and Chinese members were divided into different subunits.

On December 10, the first unit, Wonder Unit, was announced (Cheng Xiao, Bona and Dayoung). On December 17, the second three-member unit (Xuanyi, Eunseo and Yeoreum) was introduced: Joy Unit. On December 21, WJSN's Wonder and Joy Units released a Christmas cover of "All I Want For Christmas Is You" by Mariah Carey. On December 24, the third unit, Sweet Unit, was announced (Seola, Exy and Soobin). On December 31, the final unit was announced: Natural Unit (Meiqi, Luda and Dawon).

WJSN debuted on February 25, 2016, with the release of their debut mini album Would You Like?, including the title tracks "Mo Mo Mo" and "Catch Me". The group held their debut stage on the February 25th episode of M Countdown with "Catch Me" and "Mo Mo Mo".

On July 11, Starship Entertainment confirmed that I.O.I's Yoo Yeon-jung would be joining the group. In August 2016, Seola, Exy, Soobin, Eunseo, Cheng Xiao, Yeoreum, and Dayoung teamed up with label mate Monsta X to form the unit Y-Teen. It was a project unit group that promoted as CF models for KT’s phone fare service and would release EPs, music videos, and various entertainment content.

On August 17, WJSN released their second mini album The Secret with all 13 members.

2017: From. WJSN, first concert, and Happy Moment

On January 4, WJSN released their third mini album From. WJSN. The EP contains six tracks including the title track "I Wish".

WJSN held their first solo concert, "Would You Like - Happy Moment," from May 19–20 at the Blue Square Samsung Card Hall. A total of 2,000 fans gathered in two days.

WJSN's first full-length album, Happy Moment, was released on June 7, with a total of ten tracks including the lead single "Happy". The album ranked number 1 on Hanteo's daily and real-time charts after release.

2018: Dream Your Dream, and WJ Please?
On February 27, WJSN released their fourth mini album Dream Your Dream, which consists of six tracks including the lead single "Dreams Come True". Their comeback showcase was held at the Yes24 Live Hall on the same day as the album's release.

On June 1, WJSN and Weki Meki formed a project group called WJMK and released a digital single "Strong".

Two Chinese members, Meiqi and Xuanyi, participated in the Chinese version of survival show Produce 101 during the first half of 2018. The survival show concluded with Meiqi ranking 1st and Xuanyi ranking 2nd, making them both members of the temporary girl group Rocket Girls 101.

On September 19, WJSN returned with their fifth mini album WJ Please? and the title track "Save Me, Save You". The Chinese members, Cheng Xiao, Meiqi and Xuanyi, did not participate in the comeback and the group continued as ten members. Meiqi and Xuanyi were preparing to debut with Rocket Girls 101, while Cheng Xiao was filming Legend of Awakening, a Chinese historical fantasy drama as the second lead actress, which would be her acting debut.

On October 2, the group received their first music show win of their career with "Save Me, Save You" on SBS MTV's The Show.

2019: WJ Stay?, second concert, For the Summer, and As You Wish
On January 8, WJSN released their sixth mini album WJ Stay?, which consists of seven tracks including the lead single "La La Love". The group continued to promote as ten members, with the Chinese members, Cheng Xiao, Meiqi and Xuanyi, unable to participate in the comeback due to prior commitments.

WJSN held their second solo concert, "Would You Stay - Secret Box," from March 2–3 at the Blue Square Imarket Hall.

WJSN released their special album For the Summer on June 4, which consists of five tracks including the lead single "Boogie Up".

In August 2019, WJSN held their first concert tour titled WJSN 1st Mini Live 2019 "Would You Like?" Zepp Tour in Japan, starting on August 17 in Zepp DiverCity in Tokyo.

WJSN released their seventh mini album As You Wish on November 19, which consists of seven tracks including the lead single "As You Wish".

2020: Third concert, Neverland, and first sub-unit WJSN Chocome 
In 2020, WJSN had planned to hold their third concert titled WJSN Concert "Obliviate," starting on February 22, 2020, at the Olympic Hall in Seoul, South Korea and finishing on March 22, 2020, at the Toyosu PIT in Tokyo, Japan. However, due to the COVID-19 pandemic, the concert was postponed.

WJSN released their eighth mini album Neverland, including the title track "Butterfly," on June 9.

On September 23, WJSN announced the formation of the new sub-unit WJSN Chocome, featuring members Soobin, Luda, Yeoreum, and Dayoung.  They released their debut single album Hmph!, and its title track with the same name on October 7.

2021–present: Unnatural, Queendom 2, Sequence, contract renewals, and Chinese members departure 
WJSN released their ninth mini album Unnatural, with the title track of the same name on March 31, 2021.

On April 26, 2021, WJSN announced the formation of their second sub-unit WJSN The Black, featuring members Seola, Exy, Bona and Eunseo, along with announcing their first single album My Attitude and its title track "Easy", which was released on May 12.

On September 23, 2021, WJSN released the promotional single "Let Me In" through Universe Music for the mobile application Universe.

On January 5, 2022, WJSN Chocome released their second single album Super Yuppers!. On February 21, 2022, it was confirmed that WJSN will be participating in the second season of Mnet competition show Queendom, which ran from March to June 2022. Dawon did not participate in the show, while Bona joined in the third round due to scheduling conflicts with her drama Twenty-Five Twenty-One. WJSN was announced as the winners of Queendom 2 at its live finale on June 2.

On May 6, Starship Entertainment announced the group's will be holding their fourth concert tour, titled '2022 WJSN Concert Wonderland' at the Olympic Hall on June 11 and 12. Following their win on Queendom 2, it was announced that WJSN would be making a comeback on July 5 with their special single album Sequence, with the title track "Last Sequence".

On November 18, 2022, Starship Entertainment announced a fan concert '2023 WJSN Fan-Con Codename: Ujung' that took place on January 7 and 8, 2023.

On March 3, 2023, Starship Entertainment announced that Xuanyi, Cheng Xiao, and Meiqi had departed from WJSN following the expiration of their contracts. In the same announcement, it was also announced that Luda and Dawon chose not to renew their contracts, but did not specify whether they would remain in the group. On March 13, 2023, Soobin clarified that Luda and Dawon have not left WJSN, followed by an official statement by Starship Entertainment backing up the information.

Members

Current

 Exy: leader, rapper
 Seola: vocalist
 Bona: dancer
 Soobin: vocalist
 Luda: dancer 
 Dawon: vocalist 
 Eunseo: rapper
 Yeoreum: dancer
 Dayoung: vocalist
 Yeonjung: vocalist

Former

 Xuanyi: dancer
 Cheng Xiao: dancer
 Meiqi: dancer

Timeline

Subunits
 WJSN Chocome: Soobin, Luda, Yeoreum, Dayoung
 WJSN The Black: Seola, Bona, Exy, Eunseo
 Wonder Unit: Bona, Cheng Xiao, Dayoung
 Joy Unit: Xuanyi, Eunseo, Yeoreum
 Sweet Unit: Exy, Seola, Soobin
 Natural Unit: Luda, Dawon, Meiqi, Yeonjung

Discography

 Happy Moment (2017)

Filmography

Reality shows

Concert and tours

Headlining concerts
 WJSN 1st Concert "Would You Like – Happy Moment" (2017)
 WJSN Concert "Would You Stay – Secret Box" (2019)
 2022 WJSN Concert "Wonderland" (2022)

WJSN 1st Concert "Would You Like – Happy Moment"

WJSN Concert "Would You Stay – Secret Box"

2020 WJSN Concert "Obliviate" (Canceled)

2022 WJSN Concert "Wonderland"

Headlining tours
 WJSN 1st Mini Live "Would You Like?" 2019 Zepp Tour in Japan (2019)

WJSN 1st Mini Live "Would You Like?" 2019 Zepp Tour in Japan

Awards and nominations

References

External links

 
2016 establishments in South Korea
K-pop music groups
Mandarin-language singers of South Korea
Musical groups established in 2016
Musical groups from Seoul
South Korean dance music groups
South Korean girl groups
Starship Entertainment artists
Yuehua Entertainment artists